Aknestik was a Finnish guitar pop band from Haukipudas in Northern Ostrobothnia. They released seven albums and became perhaps best known for the songs Suomirokkia (Finnish rock, 1996), Toukokuussa (At May, 1988) and Jokapäivä (Everyday, 1994) .

Members 
 Jukka Takalo (vocals, 1984–2002; bass, 1984–1998)
 Kai Latvalehto (guitar and backing vocals, 1984–2002)
 Mikko Rautalin (drums and backing vocals, 1988–2002)
 Vesa Kupila (guitar and backing vocals, 1988–2002)
 Maako Härönen (bass, 1998–2002)

Discography

Albums 
 Ojat on rajat (1991)
 Valassaaret (1993)
 Onni (1994)
 Säätiedotuksia merenkulkijoille (1996)
 Aallonmurtaja (1998)
 Tulevaisuus on myöhemmin (1999)
 Vedenpaisumus (2001)

Compilations 
 Hittejä, piisejä ja hittipiisejä (1997)
 Hitit – Suomirokkia ja suuria tunteita (2000)
 Sata vuotta kaivossa – Aknestikin suurimmat hitit (2006)
 Unohtumattomat takapuolet 1 (1990–1996) (2011)
 Unohtumattomat takapuolet – B-puolia ja muita harvinaisuuksia (2012)

EPs 
 Suomen pystykorvan kadonnut onni (EP, 1990)
 Syvät veet (EP, 1992)

DVD 
 Aikakirjat DVD (2002)

References

Finnish pop music groups
Finnish rock music groups